Kekec is a 1951 Slovene/Yugoslavian adventure-youth film directed by Jože Gale. The film was based on the Kekec Above the Lonely Abyss, a mountain narrative by Josip Vandot, the last of three stories about Kekec, which was published in Slovenian youth magazine Zvonček in 1924. The film was produced by Triglav Film and originally distributed by Vesna film, currently at Viba film. The story is set in the northwest part of Slovenian mountains, mainly in author's birthplace Kranjska Gora and Julian Alps.

This is the first in the Jože Gale film series about Kekec and has two sequels: Good Luck, Kekec (Srečno, Kekec!) from 1963 and Kekec's Tricks (Kekčeve ukane) from 1968.

There were more than a thousand kids on the film's audition chosen by casting director Ernest Adamič. One of the supporting actors was Slovenian singer Lado Leskovar.

Plot summary 
Based on the popular story  ("Kekec Above the Lonely Abyss", 1924) by Josip Vandot, the story wasn't changed that much from original, but the songs with music in background were totally new. It's set in an idyllic village of the Slovenian mountains where Kekec (Matija Barl), a young boy is living.

High up in the mountains leads his solitary life Bedanec (France Presetnik), a man everybody is afraid of because he is wicked. But the brave boy Kekec is not afraid of him. When he gets to know that Bedanec keeps his victims Mojca (Zdenka Logar) and Kosobrin (Frane Milčinski) in his house, he sets out to find them. With his courage and cunning Kekec manages to set them free, and what's more, he forces Bedanec to leave for good.

Success 
This is by far the most popular and successful film in Kekec's film trilogy and one of the greatest films in Slovenian and Yugoslavian cinema history. The first Slovenian film winning international award, supposedly it went to festivals and cinemas in over sixty countries all around the world like China, where it hosted in 1957 as part of Yugoslavian film week and Argentina.

Cast

Photo gallery

Shooting locations

Film outtakes

Award 
This was the first ever international award for a Slovenian feature film. At the 13th Venice International Film Festival in 1952, this film won a Golden Lion for the best film in youth category, for kids between ages 11 and 14.

Music 
Music and theme song was written by Slovenian composer Marjan Kozina. Lyrics for theme song called  was written by Frane Milčinski and performed by Tomaž Tozon together with Slovenian Philharmonic Orchestra.

References

External links 

 

Yugoslav adventure drama films
Slovenian adventure films
1951 adventure films
1951 films
Slovene-language films
Films set in Slovenia
Films set in the Alps
Slovenian black-and-white films
Yugoslav black-and-white films